Hugo Gomes dos Santos Silva (born 18 March 1995), commonly known as Jajá, is a Brazilian professional footballer who plays as a midfielder for Liga 1 club Madura United.

Club career

Early career
Born in Rio de Janeiro, Jajá started his football career with Tigres Brasil and stayed there until 2006 when he transferred to Flamengo youth team, playing at youth level until 2015.

Flamengo
On 1 January 2015, Jajá signed his first professional contract with Flamengo. He made his league debut on 11 September 2015 against Cruzeiro at Maracanã Stadium, the Flamengo's home ground which Flamengo won by 2–0. In this match, he was substituted for Paulinho at 90+2'.

Avaí (Loan)
On 9 May 2016, Avaí announced that Jajá came Avaí on loan. On 28 May 2016, he scored his first goal against Ceará. Avaí won the match by 4–2. He has played 19 games in Série B for Avaí and scored one goal.

Kalmar FF (Loan)
In July 2018 Jajá signed with Kalmar FF, on loan, until the end of 2018 season. His contract with Flamengo was not renewed and he was released at the end of the season.

Madura United
On 15 March 2021, Madura United signed Jajá from Kalmar FF on a one-year contract. He made his league debut on 3 September by starting in a 1–1 draw against Persikabo 1973, he also scored his first goal for Madura United in the 40th minute.

International career 
Jajá has represented the member of Brazil national under-20 football team since 2015. In 2015, he was first chosen national team. He played in 2015 FIFA U-20 World Cup. He contributed that Brazil finished the competition as a runners-up, playing 6 games.

Club career statistics
(Correct )

1Other tournaments include Campeonato Carioca: 2015, 2016
2Other tournaments include Menpora Cup: 2021

Honours

International
Brazil U20
 FIFA U-20 World Cup runner-up: 2015

References

1995 births
Living people
Footballers from Rio de Janeiro (city)
Brazilian footballers
Association football midfielders
Campeonato Brasileiro Série A players
Campeonato Brasileiro Série B players
Allsvenskan players
Liga 1 (Indonesia) players
CR Flamengo footballers
Avaí FC players
Tombense Futebol Clube players
Vila Nova Futebol Clube players
Kalmar FF players
Madura United F.C. players
Expatriate footballers in Sweden
Brazilian expatriate sportspeople in Sweden
Expatriate footballers in Indonesia
Brazilian expatriate sportspeople in Indonesia
Brazil under-20 international footballers